Alma-Atinskaya is a southern terminus station of the Zamoskvoretskaya Line of the Moscow Metro. The station was opened on 24 December 2012.

On 29 November 2011 Moscow government decided to rename the station from "Brateyevo" into "Alma-Atinskaya" after the Russian name of the city of Almaty, former capital of Kazakhstan. The change reflects the rename of "Molodyozhnaya" station of Almaty Metro, still under construction in 2012, to Moskva station as a sign of friendship between Russia and Kazakhstan.

Location
The station located in the Brateyevo District. Entrances are near Brateyevskaya, Paromnaya and Klyuchevaya streets (In English: Brateyevo, Ferry and Sourse streets).

References

External links

Moscow Metro stations
Zamoskvoretskaya Line
Brateyevo District
Railway stations located underground in Russia